The Balayan National High School (BNHS) is a school in Balayan, Batangas, Philippines. It was founded in 1985 and was originally called Balayan Municipal High School, changing the Municipal to National in 1989. Over 4,000 students are enrolled annually. 

At BNHS, there is a morning and afternoon class for the Basic Education Curriculum (BEC) students. The Special Science Curriculum (SSC) students have full day instruction from Monday to Friday.

School publications 
The Sea Breeze (Ang Dalampasigan) is the official community and school publication of Balayan National High School. The newspaper contains news, facts and opinions about the latest school events, competitions, and public affairs from June to November in a particular issue. The school paper is sub-divided into four major parts namely: news page, editorial page, feature/literary page and sports page. Every school year consists of two issues: one issue in The Sea Breeze, and one in the Dalampasigan.

2009 National Schools Press Conference
The 2009 National Schools Press Conference was held at Tagum City, Davao del Norte. The "Ang Dalampasigan" competed after qualifying from the regional finals.

See also 
Department of Education

External links
DepEd Website

High schools in Batangas